Lifelines is the debut studio album by American rock band I Prevail. It was released on October 21, 2016. "Scars" was released as their first single from the album.

The album charted at number 15 on the Billboard 200, selling 19,500 copies in its first week. It had sold about 93,000 copies in the US alone as of September 2017. It is their only album to receive a certification award, being certified gold by Music Canada in September 2021.

"Come and Get It" was the official theme song for NXT TakeOver: Orlando in 2017 and All Elite Wrestling's All Out in 2019. "Lifelines" was used in a video package for The Young Bucks vs. Lucha Brothers match, at All Out.

Track listing

Personnel 

I Prevail
 Brian Burkheiser – clean vocals
 Eric Vanlerberghe – unclean vocals, clean vocals on "Lifelines"
 Dylan Bowman – rhythm guitar, backing vocals
 Steve Menoian – lead guitar
 Tony Camposeo – bass guitar
 Lee Runestad – drums

Production
 BJ Perry – production, additional clean mixing
 John Pregler – production
 Drew Fulk – additional production
 David Bendeth – mixing
 Ted Jensen – mastering at Sterling Sound, New York, NY
 Jesse Josefsson – additional programming

Management
 Rick Smith and Dana Haddad for Wildjustice Music
 Justin Hirschman – worldwide booking for Artist Group International
 Bob Becker and Chris Foitle – A&R
 Kristin Biskup – project management

Artwork
 Dan Mumford – illustrations
 Sage LaMonica – album design

Charts

Certifications

References 

2016 debut albums
Fearless Records albums
I Prevail albums
Albums produced by Erik Ron
Pop punk albums by American artists